Yolanda Rodríguez (born 26 January 1965) is a Cuban table tennis player. She competed in the women's singles event at the 1992 Summer Olympics.

References

1965 births
Living people
Cuban female table tennis players
Olympic table tennis players of Cuba
Table tennis players at the 1992 Summer Olympics
Place of birth missing (living people)
Pan American Games medalists in table tennis
Pan American Games silver medalists for Cuba
Pan American Games bronze medalists for Cuba
Table tennis players at the 1991 Pan American Games
Table tennis players at the 1995 Pan American Games
Medalists at the 1991 Pan American Games
Medalists at the 1995 Pan American Games
20th-century Cuban women